Olga Sergeyevna Ryabinkina (born 24 September 1976 in Bryansk) is a female shot putter from Russia.

She finished tenth at the 2000 Summer Olympics. At the 2004 Summer Olympics she failed to progress from the initial round.

In 2005, she achieved a personal best throw with 19.65 metres and won bronze at the European Indoor Championships and silver at the World Championships. Eight years later she was pronounced 2005 World champion when a retest of Nadzeya Astapchuk's doping sample revealed that she had been doping.

In 2006, she won the bronze medal at the World Indoor Championships, finished fourth at the 2006 European Athletics Championships and second at the World Cup, the latter in a season best of 19.54 metres.

International competitions

See also
List of World Athletics Championships medalists (women)
List of IAAF World Indoor Championships medalists (women)
List of European Athletics Championships medalists (women)
List of European Athletics Indoor Championships medalists (women)

References 

sports-reference

1976 births
Living people
Sportspeople from Bryansk
Russian female shot putters
Russian female discus throwers
Olympic female shot putters
Olympic athletes of Russia
Athletes (track and field) at the 2000 Summer Olympics
Athletes (track and field) at the 2004 Summer Olympics
World Athletics Championships athletes for Russia
World Athletics Championships medalists
World Athletics Championships winners
World Athletics Indoor Championships medalists
European Athletics Championships medalists
Russian Athletics Championships winners